Fernanda Pinheiro Monteiro Torres (born 15 September 1965) is a Brazilian film, stage and television actress and writer. She was born in Rio de Janeiro, the daughter of the Oscar-nominated actress Fernanda Montenegro and the actor Fernando Torres.

In May 1986, she received the Best Actress Award at Cannes Festival for Eu Sei Que Vou Te Amar at the age of 20.

She is married to movie producer and director Andrucha Waddington, who directed her and her mother in the 2005 film The House of Sand. They have two sons together, Joaquim (b. 2000) and Antônio (born on April 10, 2008). She is also the stepmother of João (b. 1993) and Pedro (b. 1995).

In 2003, she wrote her first script (O Redentor, 2004), with the assistance of her brother, cinematographer Cláudio Torres.

Selected filmography
Inocência (1983)
A Marvada Carne (1985)
Com Licença, Eu Vou à Luta (1986)
Eu Sei Que Vou Te Amar (1986)
A Mulher do Próximo (1988)
Kuarup (1989)
Beijo 2348/72 (1990)
One Man's War (1991)
Capitalismo Selvagem (1993)
Foreign Land (1996)
O Judeu (1996)
Four Days in September (1997)
Traição (1998)
Gêmeas (1999)
Os Normais (2003)
Redentor (2004)
The House of Sand (2005)
Saneamento Básico (2007)
A Mulher Invisível (2009)
Os Normais 2, A Noite Mais Maluca De Todas (2009)

Books 

 2013 – Fim (The End)
 2017 – A Glória e seu Cortejo de Horrores

Awards and nominations

References

External links

1965 births
Living people
Brazilian actresses
Brazilian people of Portuguese descent
Brazilian people of Italian descent
Brazilian columnists
Actresses from Rio de Janeiro (city)
Brazilian women columnists
Cannes Film Festival Award for Best Actress winners
Fernanda Montenegro